Amokura Kawharu  is a New Zealand legal academic and barrister. Kawharu was elected as a Fellow of the Royal Society Te Apārangi in 2021. She is the first woman and the first Māori to be president of the New Zealand Law Commission.

Academic and legal career 

Kawharu earned a BA/LLB(Hons) degree from the University of Auckland, followed by a Master of Laws at the University of Cambridge, with a major in international law. From 1997 to 2004 she practised commercial law in Sydney and Auckland, and between 2005 and 2020 worked at the University of Auckland, specialising in arbitration, property law and international economic regulation. She is a barrister of the High Court of New Zealand.

In 2020 she was appointed as President of the New Zealand Law Commission, and is both the first woman and the first Māori appointed to the role. Kawharu is part of  New Zealand's Māori Centre of Research Excellence, Ngā Pae o te Māramatanga. 

Kawharu has published widely in the arbitration law field, and is co-author with David Williams KC of the leading text on arbitration law in New Zealand, Williams & Kawharu on Arbitration. Now on its second edition, the first won the Legal Research Foundation's JF Northey Memorial Book Award for 2011.

Awards 
Kawharu is a Fellow of the Arbitrators’ and Mediators’ Institute of New Zealand. In 2021 she was elected as a Fellow of the Royal Society Te Apārangi. The citation said Kawharu "is the foremost scholar of New Zealand arbitration law. ...Although an established field elsewhere, New Zealand had no tradition of arbitration scholarship. With new laws adopted in 1996 and the re-birth of arbitration practice, Kawharu established arbitration as a field of academic study in New Zealand, has led reform and development of arbitration law through her scholarship and advocacy, and raised its profile internationally. As President of the Law Commission, she is now also leading the consideration of te ao Māori in the process of law reform."

Personal life 
She is affiliated with Ngāti Whātua and Ngāpuhi iwi.

She is the daughter of the late Sir Hugh and Lady Freda Kawharu.

References

External links 

 Is arbitration a  model for Māori dispute resolution? (Kawharu's new fellow's seminar at the Royal Society Te Apārangi)

New Zealand academics
New Zealand women academics
Academic staff of the University of Auckland
Ngāti Whātua people
Ngāpuhi people
University of Auckland alumni
Alumni of the University of Cambridge
New Zealand legal scholars
Year of birth missing (living people)
Fellows of the Royal Society of New Zealand
Living people